Marcus Bühl (born 29 April 1977) is a German politician. Born in Ilmenau, Thuringia, he represents Alternative for Germany (AfD). Marcus Bühl has served as a member of the Bundestag from the state of Thuringia since 2017.

Life 

He became member of the bundestag after the 2017 German federal election. He is a member of the budget committee.

In the 2021 German federal election, he won a direct mandate in Gotha – Ilm-Kreis defeating Tankred Schipanski from the Christian Democratic Union.

References

External links 

  
 Bundestag biography 

1977 births
Living people
Members of the Bundestag for Thuringia
Members of the Bundestag 2017–2021
Members of the Bundestag 2021–2025
Members of the Bundestag for the Alternative for Germany